Tove Bang (18 February 1904 – 26 March 1977) was a Danish actress. She appeared in more than 20 films between 1930 and 1975.

Selected filmography
 Jeg har elsket og levet (1940)
 En mand af betydning (1941)
 Hr. Petit (1948)
 The Crime of Tove Andersen (1953)

References

External links

1904 births
1977 deaths
Danish film actresses
Actresses from Copenhagen